In computing, Windows system may refer to:
 A Windows box, a computer running Microsoft Windows
 A windowing system, a type of software used to display graphical windows
 Microsoft Windows, an operating system